The Caltrain Express (CTX) project was implemented from 2002 to 2004 and led to the establishment of the Baby Bullet express service, which shortened the transit time between San Francisco and San Jose, and certain stations in between. New locomotives and rolling stock were purchased for dedicated express service, bypassing most stations; quad-track overtake sections were added in two locations along the Peninsula Corridor right-of-way to allow express trains to pass slower local trains that were making all stops; tracks were also upgraded with continuous-welded rail; a centralized traffic control system was added; and crossovers were added every few miles to allow single-tracking trains around disabled trains. Congresswoman Jackie Speier, then serving as a California State Senator, is credited with securing the funding for CTX and one of the new locomotives acquired for the project is named for her as a result. During commute hours, the Baby Bullet is up to 20% faster than driving south from San Francisco to San Jose.

History
In 1997, after plans to extend Caltrain to downtown San Francisco were put on hold, the Peninsula Corridor Joint Powers Board (PCJPB) started the Rapid Rail Study, which was published as a draft in October 1998. The 1998 Rapid Rail Study prioritized planned capital improvements to implement the 1997 Caltrain 20-Year Strategic Plan, which sought to improve service and increase ridership, which was assumed to correspond directly to improved service (through decreased transit times and increased train frequencies). The highest-priority projects were intended to rehabilitate the line to "reverse decades of deferred maintenance" and enhance the line by adding overtake tracks to implement express service. After rehabilitation and enhancement, the Rapid Rail Study called for electrification of the line.

The initial enhancement projects included adding third overtake tracks in Burlingame (between the stations at Millbrae and San Mateo, for northbound trains) and San Mateo (between 9th Avenue and Hillsdale, for southbound trains) to allow express trains to pass slower all-stop local trains, and adding a third turnback track in Palo Alto to allow more frequent short-line service. In 1999, PCJPB published an implementation plan for the Rapid Rail Study which called for a $280 million investment from the three counties served by Caltrain.

California State Senator Jackie Speier and Caltrain leadership are credited with the idea to provide an express service for Caltrain during a brainstorming session. Senator Speier sponsored Senate Bill 2003 in February 2000 authorizing  to fund CTX; the first draft of the bill included funding to create "little bullet" express Caltrain service between San Francisco and San Jose (with the goal to cut transit time in half compared to local, all-stop service) and also to rehabilitate the Dumbarton Rail Bridge in preparation to reroute Altamont Corridor Express (then Altamont Commuter Express) service from Stockton over the Dumbarton Rail Corridor. By March 2000, the bill was being referred to as the "Baby Bullet Bill" and it passed the Senate Transportation Committee on a 9–0 vote in April 2000 after it had been amended to remove Dumbarton Rail and focus solely on establishing express service. The funding request for the Caltrain express service was later incorporated directly into the Governor's budget. CTX was one of the projects recommended by the Metropolitan Transportation Commission (MTC) under Resolution 3434 in December 2001.

Construction
CTX officially broke ground during a ceremony held at 4th and King on June 28, 2002. The groundbreaking was attended by officials and politicians who had supported CTX, including Senator Speier, Governor Gray Davis, Secretary of Transportation and Housing Maria Contreras-Sweet, MTC Commissioner Sue Lempert, Caltrans Director Jeff Morales, and San Mateo County Supervisor Mike Nevin. At the time, it was the largest capital improvement program for Caltrain.

During CTX construction, Caltrain shut down weekend service for two years starting in July 2002 to allow track work. samTrans introduced the RRX bus line to temporarily replace weekend Caltrain service, but RRX was not a direct replacement, as the ride between San Francisco and San Jose was scheduled for 98 minutes, buses only ran until 8 P.M., and the line only had two intermediate stops, at Hillsdale and Palo Alto. After construction was complete and weekend service resumed in June 2004, Caltrain offered free rides the first two weekends to lure riders back and to thank riders for their patience. During construction, service was also reduced to a single track on Thursday and Friday nights after 9 p.m.

Baby Bullet service
By April 2004, Caltrain was showing off the rolling stock it had acquired for Baby Bullet service. Construction was substantially complete by May 2004 when Caltrain began running "test" trains on the weekends to shake down the system and gain crew experience, and the Baby Bullet trains entered revenue service on June 7, 2004; the first northbound Baby Bullet discharged over 600 passengers upon its arrival in San Francisco at 6:45 a.m., and had carried more than 1,000 during its inaugural run. The first southbound Baby Bullet left San Francisco with 420 passengers at 7:20 a.m. Baby Bullet trains often ran at standing room capacity during the first year.

Just prior to the inauguration of Baby Bullet service, Caltrain served an average of 27,000 riders per weekday. One year later, Caltrain ridership had increased by 12%, and by 2014, ten years later, Caltrain ridership had more than doubled to over 60,000 riders per weekday. Notably, once San Mateo County commuters were given the choice between BART and Caltrain to San Francisco after the completion of the BART extension to San Francisco International Airport, many riders continued to prefer Caltrain and the Baby Bullet service, which was cheaper and quicker than switching to BART at Millbrae, in part because Caltrain, which follows the 1907 Bayshore Cutoff route constructed by Southern Pacific, does not take a long detour west around San Bruno Mountain to reach San Francisco.

In addition to having one of the new locomotives named for her, Senator Speier received MTC's John F. Foran Legislative Award for her pivotal role in bringing Baby Bullet service online. CTX received an award from the California Transportation Foundation as the Program of the Year for 2004. During the same ceremony, Speier was honored as the Legislator of the Year.

In 2017, the Rail and the California Economy report noted that Baby Bullet trains operated at 95% on-time performance (making stops within ten minutes of scheduled times) and, at around 60 minutes from San Francisco to San Jose, was faster than driving south on U.S. 101 during key commute hours. Driving times during peak afternoon commute hours could reach 75 minutes or more.

Design

Caltrain split the CTX project into two separate phases, based on geographic region. The North CTX extended from San Francisco to Redwood City, and the South CTX spanned the tracks from Menlo Park to Santa Clara. The North CTX contract was awarded in April 2002 to the joint venture partnership of Herzog Contracting Corporation and Stacy & Witbeck (Herzog-Stacy-Witbeck). Herzog-Stacy-Witbeck also won the South CTX contract, as announced in January 2003. The key elements of CTX were the overtake tracks, high-speed crossovers, and a central traffic control system which collectively allowed a single office to route trains. To support smoother operation at higher sustained speeds, Caltrain also laid down continuous-welded rails.

Station rebuilds
During the CTX project, Caltrain rebuilt Bayshore station, relocating it slightly south of the prior location to accommodate the north quad track overtake section ending just south of Tunnel #4. This moved nearly all of the Bayshore station out of the City and County of San Francisco and broke a planned intermodal connection to the Third Street Light Rail Project, the first expansion phase of the Muni Metro light rail system, which was building tracks down Third Street. The new T Third Street line, which opened in 2007, terminates at Sunnydale Station as Muni Metro has never built tracks in San Mateo County, and a planned  loop extension to Bayshore was studied in 2012. A small rail bridge south of Bayshore was built over a creek as part of CTX.

Lawrence Station was in the right-of-way planned for the south quad-track overtake section, so Lawrence was rebuilt with new platforms and an under-track pedestrian tunnel. Work at Lawrence was anticipated to be completed by the end of 2003, and the rebuilt Lawrence was opened in March 2004.

The Millbrae station also received some upgrades; a third track was added and existing tracks were relocated, requiring Caltrain to demolish the existing platform. Millbrae station updates were scheduled to complete with the opening of the new intermodal station in January 2003.

Track upgrades (overtakes, crossovers, and traffic control)

CTX added quad-track overtake sections near the cities of Brisbane and Sunnyvale. During the initial design phase, overtakes were also announced for Millbrae and Redwood City. From north to south, the completed quad-track overtake sections are:

CTX also included crossover switches, which improved operating flexibility to allow trains to bypass stalled trains, and a centralized traffic control (CTC) system, which allowed track signaling and switching operations to be handled from a single facility in San Jose, rather than relying on dispatched crews throwing manual switches. Prior to CTX, trains typically had to stop and de-board operators and conductors, who would throw switches by hand. Although CTC was already partially implemented near the two main terminals at San Francisco and San Jose, CTX added CTC throughout the route, and 12 signal bridges were added to the line in total.

By November 2002, Caltrain had rebuilt  of track as part of the North CTX project, which included conversion to continuous welded rail and replacement of wooden ties with concrete ties. Full-speed testing of track upgrades occurred over two weekends in May 2004, just before the Baby Bullet service started in June. Crews and central control practiced overtaking slower trains and routing around delays induced by disabled trains.

Stops and scheduling
Baby Bullet service launched in June 2004 with ten trains per weekday, which made only four intermediate stops between San Francisco 4th & King Street and San Jose Diridon: Millbrae, Hillsdale, Palo Alto, and Mountain View. The ten trains consisted of three northbound and two southbound trains in the morning, and three southbound and two northbound trains in the afternoon; the two southbound morning trains and two northbound afternoon trains made additional stops at 22nd Street to serve reverse commuters.

The revised schedule was the product of more than two hundred iterations, and added ten trains per weekday without increasing staffing because equipment was being used more efficiently. However, mid-day (off-peak) service was reduced at seven stations; trains used to stop every half hour, but the mid-day headway changed to every hour at 22nd Street, Bayshore, South San Francisco, Broadway, Hayward Park, Atherton, and Tamien.

Riders to stations not served by Baby Bullet service complained their commute times increased because their trains slowed to allow Baby Bullets to overtake. Clem Tillier noted ridership at stations not served by Baby Bullets continued to be depressed in the years following CTX implementation, and that elimination of Baby Bullet service under a planned 76-train schedule actually improved service quality. Caltrain had initially proposed trimming the schedule from 86 trains per weekday to 48 trains only during peak hours to close a budget gap in 2011, later refining the proposal to 76 trains per weekday and eliminating Baby Bullet service. However, one-time funds were diverted from other sources and no service cuts were made in 2011.

In 2005, Caltrain expanded Baby Bullet service by adding two trains per weekday in May, and ten more trains per weekday in August, for a total of twenty-two Baby Bullet trains per weekday; the August schedule revision added express stops for certain "Pattern B" trains at San Mateo, Redwood City, Menlo Park, Sunnyvale, and Tamien.

In 2011, Caltrain added Baby Bullet service to weekend schedules. There were four weekend/holiday Baby Bullets per day (two in the mornings and two in the evenings), each making seven intermediate stops between 4th&King and Diridon: Millbrae, San Mateo, Hillsdale, Redwood City, Palo Alto, Mountain View, and Sunnyvale; these stations were selected for their proximity to activities as probable leisure time destinations.

Caltrain modified Pattern B trains to add a reverse-commute stop at Palo Alto in October 2012. With this change, all Baby Bullet trains stop at Palo Alto, regardless of pattern or direction. Caltrain shifted to a modified Pattern A on April 10, 2017, which added a reverse-commute stop at Redwood City. The revised schedule also extended service to Tamien for reverse-commute (southbound) Pattern B trains in the morning and California Ave for peak-direction (southbound) Pattern B trains in the afternoon.

Caltrain service on weekends north of Bayshore was suspended and replaced by a bus bridge from October 2018 to March 2019 in order to accommodate tunnel notching work for the Peninsula Corridor Electrification Project. Weekend Baby Bullet trains originated and terminated at Bayshore, and a bus bridge made stops at both stations in San Francisco.

In response to the COVID-19 pandemic and loss of passenger traffic, Caltrain discontinued all weekday Baby Bullet service from Monday, March 30, 2020 to August 27, 2021, and all weekend Baby Bullet service indefinitely, starting December 12, 2020. Weekday Baby Bullet service is scheduled to resume on August 30, 2021, with twelve trains total: six northbound and six southbound, with three each during peak morning and afternoon commute hours.

Rolling stock
Caltrain purchased six MPI MP36PH-3C locomotives and seventeen Bombardier BiLevel Coaches to assemble Baby Bullet trains, supplementing the existing fleet of EMD F40PH locomotives and Nippon Sharyo gallery cars, which continued in local and limited-stop service. The prime mover in the MP36PH-3C is an EMD 16-645F3B V-16 diesel, with approximately 15–20% more power than the 16-645E3B in the F40PH, and head-end power is provided by a Caterpillar C-27; Caltrain was the lead customer for the MP36PH-3C. Caltrain unveiled the first of the new locomotives, JPBX #923 in a ceremony held on April 4, 2003, at Burlingame and attended by Senator Speier. The event ended in a round-trip excursion to Redwood City. Locomotive JPBX #925 was dedicated to Senator Speier; her popularity, as evidenced by the named locomotive, was cited as one factor contributing to Lawrence Lessig's decision to withdraw from the special election (where he would have opposed her) to replace Tom Lantos in 2008.

PCJPB purchased the seventeen Bombardier cars (ten coaches and seven cab cars) from Sound Transit, which oversees the Seattle-region Sounder commuter rail service. Sound Transit had ordered thirty-two cars in 1999 to be delivered in 2001 for a planned system expansion, and a combination of events, where the manufacturer completed the cars ahead of schedule and the expansion plans were unexpectedly delayed, left the cars available for Caltrain. The cars made their debut on June 28, 2002, during the groundbreaking ceremony that accompanied the launch of CTX; dignitaries had boarded the low-floor Bombardier cars at South San Francisco and rode up to 4th and King. Bombardier cars entered revenue service in October 2002. During the first year of Baby Bullet service in 2004, the five-car Bombardier consists had a capacity of only sixteen bicycles per train, and carried heavy passenger loads.

References

External links
 
 
 
 
 
 
 
 

Caltrain